Aroga alleriella is a moth of the family Gelechiidae. It is found in North America, where it has been recorded from Alabama and Florida.

The wingspan is 17–22 mm. The forewings are black with white markings. There is a white costal streak, outwardly oblique from before the basal fourth, reaching to the fold and a smaller inwardly oblique costal streak at the apical fourth with a similar white dorsal streak opposite to it. A short longitudinal white spot is found on the middle of the cell and there is a minute white dot on the middle of the fold and a few white scales at the apex.

The larvae feed on Polygonum maritunum.

References

Moths described in 1940
Aroga
Moths of North America